"Big Poppa" is a song by American rapper The Notorious B.I.G. It was released as the second single from his first studio album Ready to Die. It features a sample of the song, "Between the Sheets" written by The Isley Brothers. "Big Poppa" was nominated for Best Rap Solo Performance at the 1996 Grammy Awards. It also went on to win at the Billboard Music Awards.

The single was certified platinum by the RIAA and sold over 1,000,000 copies domestically.

There was an official remix released in 1995 featuring Jermaine Dupri, called "Big Poppa (So So Def Remix)" which has similar lyrics, with Dupri replacing Puff Daddy, and Biggie providing a new third verse. This remix appeared as a single.

Background and content
The title is based on one of The Notorious B.I.G.'s many nicknames. The line, "I love it when you call me Big Poppa" is sampled from his first ever released material, a verse from the "Bad Boy Extended Remix" version of the Super Cat song, "Dolly My Baby" released in 1993. The song also samples the beat from The Isley Brothers' 1983 hit "Between the Sheets." It also makes a reference to the original Bad Boy artist Craig Mack, with the line, "now check it, I got more Mack than Craig in the bed...".

Legacy
 "Big Poppa" was used in the 2001 film Hardball multiple times. It was also used in the 2009 biographical film, Notorious. The song was mentioned in the 2009 film, Madea Goes to Jail, as well as being used for the party scene in 2007's Superbad.
 It briefly played in the 2007 comedy Norbit, in a scene where the title character walks in on his wife having sex with her dance teacher.
 The song was sampled by The LOX in "We'll Always Love Big Poppa" as a tribute to B.I.G., who was shot dead on March 9, 1997 in the closing track from their debut album, Money, Power & Respect.
 Omarion sampled the lyrics in his song "Let's Talk". The song was released in Maybach Music Group album, Self Made Vol. 2. (2012)
 A Spanish version of the chorus was used in a Taco Bell commercial called "Grande Papi" (2013).
 The American comedy film Paul Blart: Mall Cop 2 (2015) used the song in its second trailer.
 Will Ferrell performed a comedic version of the song in his portrayal of the singer and actor Robert Goulet in an episode of Saturday Night Live.
 "Big Poppa" was also covered by Mindless Self Indulgence in 2006.
 The song is featured in the first episode of the 2017 Netflix series She's Gotta Have It, based on Spike Lee's 1986 film of the same name.
 "Big Poppa" is referenced in the title of the internet meme "Big Floppa", centered on a caracal named Gosha (Russian: Гоша).
 In 2021, it was ranked at No. 330 on Rolling Stone's "Top 500 Greatest Songs of All Time".

Music video
The music video was filmed in late 1994 and it was released for the week ending on December 11, 1994. It premiered on BET and MTV Mary J. Blige, Craig Mack, Busta Rhymes and Treach of Naughty by Nature make cameo appearances.

Big Poppa track list

12 inch
A1 "Big Poppa" (Club Mix) (4:13)
A2 "Warning" (Club Mix) (3:41)
A3 "Big Poppa" (Instrumental) (4:13)
B1 "Big Poppa" (Radio Edit) (4:12)
B2 "Warning" (Radio Edit) (2:57)
B3 "Warning" (Instrumental) (3:41)
B4 "Who Shot Ya?"

Maxi single
 "Big Poppa" (radio edit)
 "Big Poppa" (remix radio edit)
 "Who Shot Ya?" (radio edit)
 "Big Poppa" (remix instrumental)
 "Big Poppa" (club mix)
 "Big Poppa" (remix club mix)
 "Who Shot Ya?" (club mix)
 "Warning" (club mix)

Charts

Weekly charts

Year-end charts

Certifications

References

1995 singles
Bad Boy Records singles
The Notorious B.I.G. songs
Music videos directed by Hype Williams
G-funk songs
Songs written by the Notorious B.I.G.
Songs written by Rudolph Isley
Songs written by O'Kelly Isley Jr.
Songs written by Ronald Isley
Songs written by Ernie Isley
Songs written by Marvin Isley
Songs written by Chris Jasper
1994 songs